Shin Dong-gab (Hangul: 신동갑; born January 29, 1985), better known by his stage name The Quiett (Hangul: 더콰이엇), is a South Korean rapper, composer, lyricist and record producer. He is widely known within the South Korean hip hop community for founding several major hip hop record labels, including co-founding record labels Soul Company in 2004, Illionaire Records in 2011, and Ambition Musik in 2016, the latter two with fellow rapper Dok2. He founded label Daytona Entertainment in 2020 and has remained since after Illionaire Records closed its doors.

Career

2004–2010: Soul Company and indie popularity
In 2004, The Quiett co-founded indie Korean hip hop record label and talent agency, Soul Company, alongside rappers Kebee, Jerry.K, and several other artists. He released his first album, Music, the following year. In 2006, he released a solo album, Q Train, and a collaboration with rapper Paloalto called Supremacy. His 2010 album, The Real Me, went gold, selling 7,000 copies and solidifying his reputation as one of the most popular indie rappers in Korea.

The Quiett left Soul Company in 2010 to start a new label.

2011–present: Illionaire Records, Television Appearances and Daytona Entertainment

The Quiett and rapper Dok2 founded Illionaire Records on January 1, 2011. Rapper Beenzino joined the label later that year. The record label lasted for almost a decade in which they contributed to the rise of Korean Hip-Hop in the country.

The Quiett has made several appearances in popular Korean hip-hop competitions. He appeared as a judge on the third season of the TV rap competition Show Me the Money with Dok2 in 2014, taking first place with contestant Bobby of the group IKON. He reappeared in the show's fifth season with Dok2 and in the seventh season with Changmo. He also made two appearances as a judge in High School Rapper in season three with producer Code Kunst and in season four with Yumdda after establishing his new label Daytona Entertainment.

On July 6, 2020, Illionaire Records announced through their official Instagram account that their record label will close after 10 years of operation. and Twitter account. The Quiett was the sole artist signed at the time the company closed, as former artists Dok2 and Beenzino left prior to that year. On November 11, 2020, he released his final two singles "Bentley 2" which featured Yumdda, and Abu Dhabi which featured Skinny Brown, Leellamarz, and Sik-K as a tribute to the record company.

On November 25, 2020, The Quiett and fellow rapper Yumdda established their new record label Daytona Entertainment. He remains CEO of Ambition Musik, a former sub-label under Illionaire Records, although not an artist under the label.

Discography

Studio albums

Extended plays

Collaboration albums

Charted songs

Filmography

Television show

References

External links

 

1985 births
Living people
South Korean male rappers
South Korean hip hop record producers